The 1925 Navy Midshipmen football team was an American football team that represented the United States Naval Academy as an independent during the 1925 college football season. In its first season under head coach Jack Owsley, the team compiled a 5–2–1 record, shut out four opponents, and outscored all opponents by a total of 134 to 81.

The annual Army–Navy Game was played on November 28 at the Polo Grounds in New York City;  Army

Schedule

References

Navy
Navy Midshipmen football seasons
Navy Midshipmen football